The following is a list of players, both past and current, who have appeared at least in one game for the New Orleans/Utah Jazz NBA basketball franchise.



Players
Note: Statistics are correct through the end of the  season.

A to B

|-
|align="left"| || align="center"|G || align="left"|Loyola Marymount || align="center"|1 || align="center"| || 28 || 613 || 55 || 69 || 175 || 21.9 || 2.0 || 2.5 || 6.3 || align=center|
|-
|align="left"| || align="center"|G || align="left"|Missouri State || align="center"|1 || align="center"| || 4 || 30 || 2 || 1 || 10 || 7.5 || 0.5 || 0.3 || 2.5 || align=center|
|-
|align="left"| || align="center"|G || align="left"|Duke || align="center"|1 || align="center"| || 38 || 416 || 23 || 25 || 211 || 10.9 || 0.6 || 0.7 || 5.6 || align=center|
|-
|align="left"| || align="center"|G || align="left"|Rice || align="center"|2 || align="center"|– || 34 || 294 || 38 || 10 || 105 || 8.6 || 1.1 || 0.3 || 3.1 || align=center|
|-
|align="left"| || align="center"|F/C || align="left"|Penn State || align="center"|2 || align="center"|– || 104 || 1,060 || 186 || 50 || 274 || 10.2 || 1.8 || 0.5 || 2.6 || align=center|
|-
|align="left"| || align="center"|F/C || align="left"|UNLV || align="center"|1 || align="center"| || 1 || 2 || 0 || 0 || 0 || 2.0 || 0.0 || 0.0 || 0.0 || align=center|
|-
|align="left"| || align="center"|F || align="left"|Bradley || align="center"|3 || align="center"|– || 144 || 1,922 || 427 || 109 || 734 || 13.3 || 3.0 || 0.8 || 5.1 || align=center|
|-
|align="left"| || align="center"|G/F || align="left"|Georgia || align="center"|3 || align="center"|– || 197 || 3,740 || 538 || 194 || 1,494 || 19.0 || 2.7 || 1.0 || 7.6 || align=center|
|-
|align="left"| || align="center"|C || align="left"|BYU || align="center"|1 || align="center"| || 28 || 248 || 66 || 10 || 72 || 8.9 || 2.4 || 0.4 || 2.6 || align=center|
|-
|align="left"| || align="center"|G || align="left"|FIU || align="center"|3 || align="center"|– || 145 || 3,037 || 257 || 560 || 1,264 || 20.9 || 1.8 || 3.9 || 8.7 || align=center|
|-
|align="left"| || align="center"|C || align="left"|Arizona State || align="center"|2 || align="center"|– || 77 || 418 || 114 || 11 || 190 || 5.4 || 1.5 || 0.1 || 2.5 || align=center|
|-
|align="left"| || align="center"|F || align="left"|Seton Hall || align="center"|1 || align="center"| || 5 || 44 || 12 || 1 || 9 || 8.8 || 2.4 || 0.2 || 1.8 || align=center|
|-
|align="left" bgcolor="#CCFFCC"|x || align="center"|C || align="left"|Kansas || align="center"|1 || align="center"| || 15 || 57 || 13 || 0 || 16 || 3.8 || 0.9 || 0.0 || 1.1 || align=center|
|-
|align="left"| || align="center"|G/F || align="left"|UTEP || align="center"|2 || align="center"|– || 50 || 458 || 84 || 42 || 159 || 9.2 || 1.7 || 0.8 || 3.2 || align=center|
|-
|align="left"| || align="center"|F/C || align="left"|NC State || align="center"|10 || align="center"|– || 708 || 20,523 || 3,881 || 1,124 || 9,897 || 29.0 || 5.5 || 1.6 || 14.0 || align=center|
|-
|align="left"| || align="center"|G/F || align="left"|Oregon || align="center"|1 || align="center"| || 45 || 1,238 || 128 || 137 || 586 || 27.5 || 2.8 || 3.0 || 13.0 || align=center|
|-
|align="left"| || align="center"|F/C || align="left"|Minnesota || align="center"|2 || align="center"|– || 126 || 2,903 || 984 || 222 || 1,276 || 23.0 || 7.8 || 1.8 || 10.1 || align=center|
|-
|align="left"| || align="center"|G || align="left"|FIU || align="center"|4 || align="center"|–– || 247 || 6,703 || 667 || 354 || 2,445 || 27.1 || 2.7 || 1.4 || 9.9 || align=center|
|-
|align="left" bgcolor="#FFFF99"|^ || align="center"|C || align="left"|Indiana || align="center"|1 || align="center"| || 1 || 14 || 5 || 0 || 6 || 14.0 || 5.0 || 0.0 || 6.0 || align=center|
|-
|align="left"| || align="center"|F || align="left"|Towson || align="center"|1 || align="center"| || 2 || 3 || 3 || 0 || 0 || 1.5 || 1.5 || 0.0 || 0.0 || align=center|
|-
|align="left"| || align="center"|F || align="left"|Pittsburgh || align="center"|1 || align="center"| || 28 || 313 || 93 || 15 || 105 || 11.2 || 3.3 || 0.5 || 3.8 || align=center|
|-
|align="left"| || align="center"|F || align="left"|Alabama || align="center"|6 || align="center"|– || 415 || 8,191 || 1,780 || 262 || 3,035 || 19.7 || 4.3 || 0.6 || 7.3 || align=center|
|-
|align="left"| || align="center"|C || align="left"|Indiana || align="center"|1 || align="center"| || 73 || 895 || 231 || 39 || 329 || 12.3 || 3.2 || 0.5 || 4.5 || align=center|
|-
|align="left"| || align="center"|G || align="left"|UCLA || align="center"|2 || align="center"|– || 107 || 2,296 || 229 || 301 || 982 || 21.5 || 2.1 || 2.8 || 9.2 || align=center|
|-
|align="left"| || align="center"|C || align="left"|Latvia || align="center"|1 || align="center"| || 6 || 45 || 17 || 0 || 3 || 7.5 || 2.8 || 0.0 || 0.5 || align=center|
|-
|align="left"| || align="center"|F/C || align="left"|USC || align="center"|1 || align="center"| || 4 || 57 || 18 || 7 || 27 || 14.3 || 4.5 || 1.8 || 6.8 || align=center|
|-
|align="left" bgcolor="#CCFFCC"|x || align="center"|F || align="left"|Croatia || align="center"|1 || align="center"| || 63 || 2,083 || 259 || 131 || 1,275 || 33.1 || 4.1 || 2.1 || 20.2 || align=center|
|-
|align="left"| || align="center"|F || align="left"|Weber State || align="center"|1 || align="center"| || 12 || 53 || 17 || 2 || 22 || 4.4 || 1.4 || 0.2 || 1.8 || align=center|
|-
|align="left"| || align="center"|G || align="left"|Minnesota || align="center"|2 || align="center"|– || 74 || 798 || 88 || 48 || 273 || 10.8 || 1.2 || 0.6 || 3.7 || align=center|
|-
|align="left"| || align="center"|F || align="left"|Clemson || align="center"|2 || align="center"|– || 158 || 3,196 || 849 || 167 || 1,030 || 20.2 || 5.4 || 1.1 || 6.5 || align=center|
|-
|align="left"| || align="center"|G/F || align="left"|Idaho State || align="center"|2 || align="center"|– || 127 || 3,432 || 300 || 463 || 1,376 || 27.0 || 2.4 || 3.6 || 10.8 || align=center|
|-
|align="left" bgcolor="#FFCC00"|+ || align="center"|F/C || align="left"|Duke || align="center"|6 || align="center"|– || 354 || 12,051 || 3,712 || 1,012 || 6,821 || 34.0 || 10.5 || 2.9 || 19.3 || align=center|
|-
|align="left"| || align="center"|C || align="left"|Stanford || align="center"|2 || align="center"|– || 83 || 1,117 || 278 || 64 || 258 || 13.5 || 3.3 || 0.8 || 3.1 || align=center|
|-
|align="left"| || align="center"|F/C || align="left"|South Carolina || align="center"|2 || align="center"| || 99 || 1,816 || 392 || 131 || 773 || 18.3 || 4.0 || 1.3 || 7.8 || align=center|
|-
|align="left"| || align="center"|G || align="left"|Oregon State || align="center"|3 || align="center"|– || 98 || 2,159 || 139 || 273 || 741 || 22.0 || 1.4 || 2.8 || 7.6 || align=center|
|-
|align="left"| || align="center"|F || align="left"|Boston University || align="center"|1 || align="center"| || 6 || 25 || 5 || 2 || 19 || 4.2 || 0.8 || 0.3 || 3.2 || align=center|
|-
|align="left"| || align="center"|F/C || align="left"|North Carolina || align="center"|3 || align="center"|– || 70 || 728 || 293 || 25 || 310 || 10.4 || 4.2 || 0.4 || 4.4 || align=center|
|-
|align="left" bgcolor="#CCFFCC"|x || align="center"|F || align="left"|College of Charleston || align="center"|1 || align="center"| || 9 || 96 || 20 || 11 || 24 || 10.7 || 2.2 || 1.2 || 2.7 || align=center|
|-
|align="left"| || align="center"|G/F || align="left"|Arkansas || align="center"|4 || align="center"|– || 266 || 7,030 || 773 || 488 || 2,786 || 26.4 || 2.9 || 1.8 || 10.5 || align=center|
|-
|align="left"| || align="center"|G/F || align="left"|Virginia Tech || align="center"|2 || align="center"|– || 164 || 4,305 || 942 || 724 || 1,666 || 26.3 || 5.7 || 4.4 || 10.2 || align=center|
|-
|align="left"| || align="center"|G || align="left"|Illinois || align="center"|1 || align="center"| || 49 || 450 || 40 || 83 || 94 || 9.2 || 0.8 || 1.7 || 1.9 || align=center|
|-
|align="left"| || align="center"|G || align="left"|UTSA || align="center"|1 || align="center"| || 81 || 1,711 || 207 || 104 || 611 || 21.1 || 2.6 || 1.3 || 7.5 || align=center|
|-
|align="left"| || align="center"|F || align="left"|Missouri || align="center"|1 || align="center"| || 4 || 24 || 9 || 4 || 4 || 6.0 || 2.3 || 1.0 || 1.0 || align=center|
|-
|align="left"| || align="center"|F/C || align="left"|George Washington || align="center"|5 || align="center"|– || 394 || 7,173 || 1,835 || 282 || 2,299 || 18.2 || 4.7 || 0.7 || 5.8 || align=center|
|-
|align="left"| || align="center"|F || align="left"|Idaho || align="center"|1 || align="center"| || 16 || 56 || 15 || 4 || 16 || 3.5 || 0.9 || 0.3 || 1.0 || align=center|
|-
|align="left"| || align="center"|G/F || align="left"|Arkansas || align="center"|1 || align="center"| || 23 || 267 || 39 || 13 || 78 || 11.6 || 1.7 || 0.6 || 3.4 || align=center|
|-
|align="left"| || align="center"|G || align="left"|Michigan || align="center"|3 || align="center"|– || 210 || 5,916 || 524 || 872 || 2,547 || 28.2 || 2.5 || 4.2 || 12.1 || align=center|
|-
|align="left"| || align="center"|G || align="left"|Colorado || align="center"|8 || align="center"|– || 382 || 7,946 || 1,096 || 621 || 3,671 || 20.8 || 2.9 || 1.6 || 9.6 || align=center|
|-
|align="left"| || align="center"|F || align="left"|Syracuse || align="center"|1 || align="center"| || 36 || 530 || 94 || 43 || 189 || 14.7 || 2.6 || 1.2 || 5.3 || align=center|
|}

C

|-
|align="left"| || align="center"|G || align="left"|USC || align="center"|1 || align="center"| || 48 || 772 || 84 || 134 || 306 || 16.1 || 1.8 || 2.8 || 6.4 || align=center|
|-
|align="left"| || align="center"|F/C || align="left"|Wichita State || align="center"|4 || align="center"|– || 306 || 5,755 || 791 || 263 || 2,307 || 18.8 || 2.6 || 0.9 || 7.5 || align=center|
|-
|align="left"| || align="center"|F || align="left"|Missouri || align="center"|2 || align="center"|– || 86 || 1,438 || 238 || 76 || 488 || 16.7 || 2.8 || 0.9 || 5.7 || align=center|
|-
|align="left"| || align="center"|F || align="left"|Auburn || align="center"|1 || align="center"| || 49 || 337 || 73 || 7 || 150 || 6.9 || 1.5 || 0.1 || 3.1 || align=center|
|-
|align="left"| || align="center"|F || align="left"|George Washington || align="center"|1 || align="center"| || 11 || 39 || 8 || 1 || 9 || 3.5 || 0.7 || 0.1 || 0.8 || align=center|
|-
|align="left"| || align="center"|F/C || align="left"|Utah || align="center"|2 || align="center"|– || 161 || 3,078 || 539 || 152 || 1,396 || 19.1 || 3.3 || 0.9 || 8.7 || align=center|
|-
|align="left"| || align="center"|G/F || align="left"|Indiana || align="center"|1 || align="center"| || 81 || 2,351 || 284 || 163 || 700 || 29.0 || 3.5 || 2.0 || 8.6 || align=center|
|-
|align="left"| || align="center"|F/C || align="left"|North Carolina || align="center"|1 || align="center"| || 26 || 224 || 43 || 10 || 47 || 8.6 || 1.7 || 0.4 || 1.8 || align=center|
|-
|align="left"| || align="center"|G/F || align="left"|California || align="center"|1 || align="center"| || 4 || 29 || 6 || 0 || 6 || 7.3 || 1.5 || 0.0 || 1.5 || align=center|
|-
|align="left"| || align="center"|G || align="left"|Belmont || align="center"|2 || align="center"|– || 46 || 333 || 32 || 25 || 112 || 7.2 || 0.7 || 0.5 || 2.4 || align=center|
|-
|align="left"| || align="center"|F/C || align="left"|UNLV || align="center"|1 || align="center"| || 2 || 27 || 7 || 1 || 4 || 13.5 || 3.5 || 0.5 || 2.0 || align=center|
|-
|align="left" bgcolor="#CCFFCC"|x || align="center"|G || align="left"|Missouri || align="center"|2 || align="center"|– || 110 || 2,857 || 392 || 234 || 1,906 || 26.0 || 3.6 || 2.1 || 17.3 || align=center|
|-
|align="left"| || align="center"|F || align="left"|Houston Baptist || align="center"|3 || align="center"|– || 221 || 6,395 || 1,516 || 295 || 1,775 || 28.9 || 6.9 || 1.3 || 8.0 || align=center|
|-
|align="left"| || align="center"|F/C || align="left"|Stanford || align="center"|8 || align="center"|– || 480 || 8,100 || 1,493 || 411 || 2,042 || 16.9 || 3.1 || 0.9 || 4.3 || align=center|
|-
|align="left" bgcolor="#FBCEB1"|* || align="center"|G || align="left"|Ohio State || align="center"|2 || align="center"|– || 98 || 2,861 || 328 || 513 || 1,502 || 29.2 || 3.3 || 5.2 || 15.3 || align=center|
|-
|align="left"| || align="center"|F/C || align="left"|Idaho State || align="center"|1 || align="center"| || 2 || 17 || 5 || 0 || 7 || 8.5 || 2.5 || 0.0 || 3.5 || align=center|
|-
|align="left"| || align="center"|F/C || align="left"|Notre Dame || align="center"|1 || align="center"| || 16 || 87 || 25 || 1 || 27 || 5.4 || 1.6 || 0.1 || 1.7 || align=center|
|-
|align="left"| || align="center"|F/C || align="left"|New Orleans || align="center"|1 || align="center"| || 71 || 1,420 || 440 || 52 || 489 || 20.0 || 6.2 || 0.7 || 6.9 || align=center|
|-
|align="left"| || align="center"|G/F || align="left"|DePaul || align="center"|3 || align="center"|– || 233 || 6,567 || 1,311 || 402 || 2,231 || 28.2 || 5.6 || 1.7 || 9.6 || align=center|
|-
|align="left"| || align="center"|G || align="left"|Providence || align="center"|1 || align="center"| || 15 || 159 || 18 || 15 || 80 || 10.6 || 1.2 || 1.0 || 5.3 || align=center|
|-
|align="left"| || align="center"|F/C || align="left"|Oregon State || align="center"|2 || align="center"|– || 105 || 1,740 || 541 || 220 || 610 || 16.6 || 5.2 || 2.1 || 5.8 || align=center|
|-
|align="left"| || align="center"|C || align="left"|Houston || align="center"|1 || align="center"| || 4 || 18 || 3 || 0 || 4 || 4.5 || 0.8 || 0.0 || 1.0 || align=center|
|-
|align="left"| || align="center"|G || align="left"|Virginia || align="center"|5 || align="center"|–– || 237 || 2,641 || 248 || 512 || 878 || 11.1 || 1.0 || 2.2 || 3.7 || align=center|
|-
|align="left"| || align="center"|G/F || align="left"|Kentucky Wesleyan || align="center"|1 || align="center"| || 51 || 328 || 41 || 17 || 114 || 6.4 || 0.8 || 0.3 || 2.2 || align=center|
|-
|align="left"| || align="center"|F || align="left"|Marquette || align="center"|2 || align="center"|– || 107 || 2,910 || 486 || 174 || 1,270 || 27.2 || 4.5 || 1.6 || 11.9 || align=center|
|-
|align="left"| || align="center"|F/C || align="left"|Cincinnati || align="center"|1 || align="center"| || 4 || 26 || 5 || 0 || 15 || 6.5 || 1.3 || 0.0 || 3.8 || align=center|
|-
|align="left"| || align="center"|C || align="left"|Temple || align="center"|1 || align="center"| || 6 || 38 || 8 || 1 || 8 || 6.3 || 1.3 || 0.2 || 1.3 || align=center|
|-
|align="left"| || align="center"|G || align="left"|Virginia Tech || align="center"|1 || align="center"| || 67 || 636 || 78 || 58 || 325 || 9.5 || 1.2 || 0.9 || 4.9 || align=center|
|}

D to F

|-
|align="left" bgcolor="#FFFF99"|^ (#4) || align="center"|G/F || align="left"|Notre Dame || align="center"|7 || align="center"|– || 461 || 17,899 || 2,845 || 1,702 || 13,635 || 38.8 || 6.2 || 3.7 || bgcolor="#CFECEC"|29.6 || align=center|
|-
|align="left"| || align="center"|G || align="left"|Maryland || align="center"|1 || align="center"| || 13 || 225 || 15 || 45 || 76 || 17.3 || 1.2 || 3.5 || 5.8 || align=center|
|-
|align="left"| || align="center"|C || align="left"|North Carolina || align="center"|1 || align="center"| || 28 || 303 || 105 || 12 || 51 || 10.8 || 3.8 || 0.4 || 1.8 || align=center|
|-
|align="left"| || align="center"|C || align="left"|Maynard Evans HS (FL) || align="center"|1 || align="center"| || 4 || 26 || 5 || 1 || 6 || 6.5 || 1.3 || 0.3 || 1.5 || align=center|
|-
|align="left"| || align="center"|F || align="left"|Northern Illinois || align="center"|1 || align="center"| || 57 || 776 || 125 || 77 || 316 || 13.6 || 2.2 || 1.4 || 5.5 || align=center|
|-
|align="left"| || align="center"|G || align="left"|Utah || align="center"|1 || align="center"| || 7 || 48 || 6 || 6 || 10 || 6.9 || 0.9 || 0.9 || 1.4 || align=center|
|-
|align="left"| || align="center"|F/C || align="left"|France || align="center"|1 || align="center"| || 73 || 1,283 || 158 || 170 || 338 || 17.6 || 2.2 || 2.3 || 4.6 || align=center|
|-
|align="left"| || align="center"|C || align="left"|Washington State || align="center"|2 || align="center"| || 49 || 707 || 136 || 15 || 131 || 14.4 || 2.8 || 0.3 || 2.7 || align=center|
|-
|align="left"| || align="center"|G/F || align="left"|Gardner-Webb || align="center"|3 || align="center"|– || 144 || 3,466 || 655 || 267 || 2,670 || 24.1 || 4.5 || 1.9 || 18.5 || align=center|
|-
|align="left"| || align="center"|G || align="left"|Georgetown || align="center"|2 || align="center"|– || 119 || 1,514 || 119 || 211 || 343 || 12.7 || 1.0 || 1.8 || 2.9 || align=center|
|-
|align="left" bgcolor="#FFCC00"|+ (#53) || align="center"|C || align="left"|UCLA || align="center"|11 || align="center"|– || 875 || 25,169 || 6,939 || 840 || 5,216 || 28.8 || 7.9 || 1.0 || 6.0 || align=center|
|-
|align="left"| || align="center"|G || align="left"|Louisville || align="center"|2 || align="center"|– || 162 || 2,622 || 207 || 410 || 1,117 || 16.2 || 1.3 || 2.5 || 6.9 || align=center|
|-
|align="left"| || align="center"|G/F || align="left"|East Carolina || align="center"|4 || align="center"|– || 261 || 6,388 || 815 || 420 || 2,560 || 24.5 || 3.1 || 1.6 || 9.8 || align=center|
|-
|align="left"| || align="center"|G || align="left"|Boston College || align="center"|6 || align="center"|– || 435 || 8,332 || 682 || 1,472 || 2,779 || 19.2 || 1.6 || 3.4 || 6.4 || align=center|
|-
|align="left"| || align="center"|C || align="left"|California || align="center"|1 || align="center"| || 62 || 610 || 115 || 33 || 134 || 9.8 || 1.9 || 0.5 || 2.2 || align=center|
|-
|align="left"| || align="center"|F || align="left"|Western Kentucky || align="center"|5 || align="center"|– || 219 || 2,370 || 586 || 105 || 806 || 10.8 || 2.7 || 0.5 || 3.7 || align=center|
|-
|align="left"| || align="center"|G || align="left"|Australia || align="center"|5 || align="center"|– || 215 || 4,027 || 369 || 469 || 1,231 || 18.7 || 1.7 || 2.2 || 5.7 || align=center|
|-
|align="left"| || align="center"|G || align="left"|Alabama || align="center"|1 || align="center"| || 37 || 412 || 55 || 28 || 152 || 11.1 || 1.5 || 0.8 || 4.1 || align=center|
|-
|align="left" bgcolor="#CCFFCC"|x || align="center"|F/C || align="left"|Georgia Tech || align="center"|10 || align="center"|– || 644 || 16,215 || 4,626 || 724 || 7,336 || 25.2 || 7.2 || 1.1 || 11.4 || align=center|
|-
|align="left"| || align="center"|C || align="left"|Ukraine || align="center"|4 || align="center"|– || 132 || 1,090 || 260 || 39 || 297 || 8.3 || 2.0 || 0.3 || 2.3 || align=center|
|-
|align="left"| || align="center"|G || align="left"|Little Rock || align="center"|1 || align="center"| || 82 || 2,287 || 149 || 274 || 826 || 27.9 || 1.8 || 3.3 || 10.1 || align=center|
|-
|align="left"| || align="center"|F/C || align="left"|UTEP || align="center"|4 || align="center"|– || 272 || 3,627 || 721 || 132 || 1,113 || 13.3 || 2.7 || 0.5 || 4.1 || align=center|
|-
|align="left"| || align="center"|G || align="left"|Villanova || align="center"|1 || align="center"| || 82 || 2,249 || 127 || 167 || 882 || 27.4 || 1.5 || 2.0 || 10.8 || align=center|
|-
|align="left"| || align="center"|G || align="left"|BYU || align="center"|1 || align="center"| || 31 || 432 || 46 || 52 || 127 || 13.9 || 1.5 || 1.7 || 4.1 || align=center|
|-
|align="left"| || align="center"|C || align="left"|NC State || align="center"|1 || align="center"| || 42 || 462 || 101 || 6 || 142 || 11.0 || 2.4 || 0.1 || 3.4 || align=center|
|-
|align="left"| || align="center"|G/F || align="left"|Michigan State || align="center"|1 || align="center"| || 55 || 1,718 || 152 || 221 || 878 || 31.2 || 2.8 || 4.0 || 16.0 || align=center|
|}

G to H

|-
|align="left"| || align="center"|G || align="left"|Georgia || align="center"|1 || align="center"| || 32 || 217 || 29 || 39 || 106 || 6.8 || 0.9 || 1.2 || 3.3 || align=center|
|-
|align="left"| || align="center"|C || align="left"|Creighton || align="center"|1 || align="center"| || 2 || 3 || 0 || 0 || 6 || 1.5 || 0.0 || 0.0 || 3.0 || align=center|
|-
|align="left"| || align="center"|G || align="left"|Iowa State || align="center"|1 || align="center"| || 71 || 1,048 || 97 || 120 || 248 || 14.8 || 1.4 || 1.7 || 3.5 || align=center|
|-
|align="left"| || align="center"|F/C || align="left"|Pacific || align="center"|1 || align="center"| || 17 || 285 || 62 || 17 || 55 || 16.8 || 3.6 || 1.0 || 3.2 || align=center|
|-
|align="left"| || align="center"|F/C || align="left"|UNLV || align="center"|1 || align="center"| || 50 || 782 || 209 || 42 || 333 || 15.6 || 4.2 || 0.8 || 6.7 || align=center|
|-
|align="left"| || align="center"|G/F || align="left"|Croatia || align="center"|5 || align="center"|– || 226 || 4,689 || 474 || 321 || 2,016 || 20.7 || 2.1 || 1.4 || 8.9 || align=center|
|-
|align="left" bgcolor="#FBCEB1"|* || align="center"|C || align="left"|France || align="center"|8 || align="center"|– || 545 || 16,181 || 6,151 || 735 || 6,565 || 29.7 || 11.3 || 1.3 || 12.0 || align=center|
|-
|align="left" bgcolor="#FFFF99"|^ || align="center"|G || align="left"|UCLA || align="center"|3 || align="center"|– || 182 || 5,292 || 421 || 819 || 2,582 || 29.1 || 2.3 || 4.5 || 14.2 || align=center|
|-
|align="left"| || align="center"|C || align="left"|Wisconsin || align="center"|1 || align="center"| || 10 || 98 || 17 || 3 || 25 || 9.8 || 1.7 || 0.3 || 2.5 || align=center|
|-
|align="left"| || align="center"|G || align="left"|Virginia Tech || align="center"|1 || align="center"| || 6 || 35 || 5 || 2 || 13 || 5.8 || 0.8 || 0.3 || 2.2 || align=center|
|-
|align="left"| || align="center"|F || align="left"|Georgetown || align="center"|1 || align="center"| || 30 || 553 || 81 || 20 || 233 || 18.4 || 2.7 || 0.7 || 7.8 || align=center|
|-
|align="left"| || align="center"|F/C || align="left"|Morehead State || align="center"|1 || align="center"| || 15 || 280 || 109 || 16 || 57 || 18.7 || 7.3 || 1.1 || 3.8 || align=center|
|-
|align="left" bgcolor="#FFCC00"|+ || align="center"|G || align="left"|Michigan || align="center"|8 || align="center"|– || 606 || 17,329 || 1,379 || 4,159 || 6,917 || 28.6 || 2.3 || 6.9 || 11.4 || align=center|
|-
|align="left"| || align="center"|G/F || align="left"|Iona || align="center"|1 || align="center"| || 1 || 2 || 0 || 0 || 0 || 2.0 || 0.0 || 0.0 || 0.0 || align=center|
|-
|align="left"| || align="center"|G || align="left"|Southern || align="center"|1 || align="center"| || 59 || 809 || 68 || 140 || 232 || 13.7 || 1.2 || 2.4 || 3.9 || align=center|
|-
|align="left"| || align="center"|F/C || align="left"|Western Michigan || align="center"|3 || align="center"|– || 240 || 4,896 || 1,396 || 477 || 1,160 || 20.4 || 5.8 || 2.0 || 4.8 || align=center|
|-
|align="left"| (#35) || align="center"|G || align="left"|Louisville || align="center"|10 || align="center"|–– || 765 || 21,403 || 2,519 || 1,627 || 12,391 || 28.0 || 3.3 || 2.1 || 16.2 || align=center|
|-
|align="left"| || align="center"|F || align="left"|NC State || align="center"|1 || align="center"| || 25 || 515 || 131 || 42 || 93 || 20.6 || 5.2 || 1.7 || 3.7 || align=center|
|-
|align="left"| || align="center"|C || align="left"|Western Michigan || align="center"|2 || align="center"|– || 38 || 469 || 120 || 19 || 163 || 12.3 || 3.2 || 0.5 || 4.3 || align=center|
|-
|align="left"| || align="center"|G || align="left"|Iowa || align="center"|7 || align="center"|– || 471 || 9,484 || 1,109 || 788 || 3,550 || 20.1 || 2.4 || 1.7 || 7.5 || align=center|
|-
|align="left"| || align="center"|F/C || align="left"|San Francisco || align="center"|4 || align="center"|– || 249 || 5,379 || 1,312 || 315 || 1,410 || 21.6 || 5.3 || 1.3 || 5.7 || align=center|
|-
|align="left"| || align="center"|F || align="left"|Georgia Tech || align="center"|7 || align="center"|– || 474 || 12,251 || 2,325 || 645 || 5,640 || 25.8 || 4.9 || 1.4 || 11.9 || align=center|
|-
|align="left"| || align="center"|G || align="left"|Wisconsin || align="center"|2 || align="center"|– || 80 || 2,271 || 152 || 408 || 983 || 28.4 || 1.9 || 5.1 || 12.3 || align=center|
|-
|align="left"| || align="center"|F || align="left"|Rice || align="center"|1 || align="center"| || 20 || 225 || 33 || 5 || 84 || 11.3 || 1.7 || 0.3 || 4.2 || align=center|
|-
|align="left"| || align="center"|G || align="left"|Syracuse || align="center"|1 || align="center"| || 57 || 606 || 55 || 86 || 165 || 10.6 || 1.0 || 1.5 || 2.9 || align=center|
|-
|align="left"| || align="center"|C || align="left"|Idaho State || align="center"|1 || align="center"| || 58 || 397 || 77 || 7 || 89 || 6.8 || 1.3 || 0.1 || 1.5 || align=center|
|-
|align="left" bgcolor="#FFCC00"|+ || align="center"|G/F || align="left"|Butler || align="center"|7 || align="center"|– || 516 || 16,164 || 2,149 || 1,762 || 8,077 || 31.3 || 4.2 || 3.4 || 15.7 || align=center|
|-
|align="left" bgcolor="#FFFF99"|^ || align="center"|F/C || align="left"|Detroit Mercy || align="center"|1 || align="center"| || 34 || 1,338 || 327 || 71 || 816 || 39.4 || 9.6 || 2.1 || 24.0 || align=center|
|-
|align="left"| || align="center"|G || align="left"|IUPUI || align="center"|1 || align="center"| || 49 || 1,544 || 167 || 204 || 829 || 31.5 || 3.4 || 4.2 || 16.9 || align=center|
|-
|align="left"| || align="center"|G/F || align="left"|Duke || align="center"|4 || align="center"|– || 227 || 6,282 || 697 || 457 || 2,985 || 27.7 || 3.1 || 2.0 || 13.1 || align=center|
|-
|align="left"| (#14) || align="center"|G || align="left"|Iowa State || align="center"|7 || align="center"|– || 477 || 14,730 || 1,339 || 1,895 || 6,848 || 30.9 || 2.8 || 4.0 || 14.4 || align=center|
|-
|align="left"| || align="center"|G/F || align="left"|Wake Forest || align="center"|1 || align="center"| || 43 || 991 || 158 || 50 || 372 || 23.0 || 3.7 || 1.2 || 8.7 || align=center|
|-
|align="left"| || align="center"|G || align="left"|Maryland || align="center"|1 || align="center"| || 23 || 317 || 34 || 37 || 131 || 13.8 || 1.5 || 1.6 || 5.7 || align=center|
|-
|align="left"| || align="center"|F || align="left"|DePaul || align="center"|3 || align="center"|– || 100 || 662 || 152 || 21 || 285 || 6.6 || 1.5 || 0.2 || 2.9 || align=center|
|-
|align="left"| || align="center"|G || align="left"|Southern Illinois || align="center"|1 || align="center"| || 8 || 23 || 2 || 4 || 12 || 2.9 || 0.3 || 0.5 || 1.5 || align=center|
|-
|align="left"| || align="center"|G || align="left"|Colorado State || align="center"|1 || align="center"| || 11 || 42 || 4 || 8 || 17 || 3.8 || 0.4 || 0.7 || 1.5 || align=center|
|-
|align="left" bgcolor="#CCFFCC"|x || align="center"|F || align="left"|Syracuse || align="center"|1 || align="center"| || 18 || 64 || 9 || 6 || 31 || 3.6 || 0.5 || 0.3 || 1.7 || align=center|
|-
|align="left"| || align="center"|G || align="left"|Colorado || align="center"|3 || align="center"|– || 165 || 3,802 || 280 || 545 || 1,261 || 23.0 || 1.7 || 3.3 || 7.6 || align=center|
|-
|align="left"| || align="center"|F/C || align="left"|Minnesota || align="center"|2 || align="center"|– || 129 || 1,492 || 354 || 73 || 466 || 11.6 || 2.7 || 0.6 || 3.6 || align=center|
|}

I to K

|-
|align="left"| || align="center"|F || align="left"|Virginia || align="center"|4 || align="center"|– || 262 || 3,224 || 650 || 164 || 927 || 12.3 || 2.5 || 0.6 || 3.5 || align=center|
|-
|align="left" bgcolor="#CCFFCC"|x || align="center"|F || align="left"|Turkey || align="center"|1 || align="center"| || 17 || 148 || 29 || 4 || 65 || 8.7 || 1.7 || 0.2 || 3.8 || align=center|
|-
|align="left" bgcolor="#CCFFCC"|x || align="center"|G/F || align="left"|Australia || align="center"|7 || align="center"|– || 545 || 14,036 || 1,783 || 2,055 || 4,769 || 25.8 || 3.3 || 3.8 || 8.8 || align=center|
|-
|align="left"| || align="center"|G || align="left"|St. John's || align="center"|1 || align="center"| || 82 || 1,467 || 176 || 375 || 382 || 17.9 || 2.1 || 4.6 || 4.7 || align=center|
|-
|align="left"| || align="center"|G/F || align="left"|Ohio || align="center"|1 || align="center"| || 1 || 4 || 1 || 0 || 1 || 4.0 || 1.0 || 0.0 || 1.0 || align=center|
|-
|align="left"| || align="center"|F || align="left"|Grambling State || align="center"|5 || align="center"|– || 356 || 7,671 || 1,470 || 370 || 3,829 || 21.5 || 4.1 || 1.0 || 10.8 || align=center|
|-
|align="left"| || align="center"|F || align="left"|St. Mary's (TX) || align="center"|1 || align="center"| || 2 || 9 || 1 || 0 || 7 || 4.5 || 0.5 || 0.0 || 3.5 || align=center|
|-
|align="left"| || align="center"|G || align="left"|Robert Morris (IL) || align="center"|1 || align="center"| || 14 || 73 || 19 || 1 || 37 || 5.2 || 1.4 || 0.1 || 2.6 || align=center|
|-
|align="left"| || align="center"|F/C || align="left"|Prentiss HS (MS) || align="center"|3 || align="center"|– || 221 || 7,593 || 2,099 || 447 || 4,089 || 34.4 || 9.5 || 2.0 || 18.5 || align=center|
|-
|align="left"| || align="center"|F || align="left"|Arizona || align="center"|1 || align="center"| || 82 || 2,213 || 219 || 130 || 831 || 27.0 || 2.7 || 1.6 || 10.1 || align=center|
|-
|align="left"| || align="center"|F || align="left"|Sweden || align="center"|1 || align="center"| || 74 || 1,134 || 246 || 42 || 429 || 15.3 || 3.3 || 0.6 || 5.8 || align=center|
|-
|align="left"| || align="center"|F || align="left"|Arizona || align="center"|1 || align="center"| || 3 || 26 || 5 || 2 || 9 || 8.7 || 1.7 || 0.7 || 3.0 || align=center|
|-
|align="left"| || align="center"|G/F || align="left"|Dayton || align="center"|2 || align="center"|– || 82 || 1,068 || 150 || 52 || 286 || 13.0 || 1.8 || 0.6 || 3.5 || align=center|
|-
|align="left"| || align="center"|G || align="left"|Nebraska || align="center"|1 || align="center"| || 48 || 272 || 28 || 64 || 54 || 5.7 || 0.6 || 1.3 || 1.1 || align=center|
|-
|align="left"| || align="center"|G/F || align="left"|Arkansas || align="center"|2 || align="center"|– || 110 || 2,543 || 350 || 189 || 948 || 23.1 || 3.2 || 1.7 || 8.6 || align=center|
|-
|align="left"| || align="center"|F || align="left"|Temple || align="center"|1 || align="center"| || 43 || 1,159 || 177 || 80 || 340 || 27.0 || 4.1 || 1.9 || 7.9 || align=center|
|-
|align="left"| || align="center"|F || align="left"|Tampa || align="center"|1 || align="center"| || 6 || 13 || 2 || 0 || 11 || 2.2 || 0.3 || 0.0 || 1.8 || align=center|
|-
|align="left"| || align="center"|G/F || align="left"|Utah || align="center"|1 || align="center"| || 62 || 666 || 93 || 59 || 238 || 10.7 || 1.5 || 1.0 || 3.8 || align=center|
|-
|align="left"| || align="center"|C || align="left"|Turkey || align="center"|4 || align="center"|– || 265 || 5,416 || 1,564 || 140 || 2,475 || 20.4 || 5.9 || 0.5 || 9.3 || align=center|
|-
|align="left"| || align="center"|F || align="left"|Stanford || align="center"|6 || align="center"|– || 405 || 7,186 || 1,714 || 277 || 2,124 || 17.7 || 4.2 || 0.7 || 5.2 || align=center|
|-
|align="left"| || align="center"|F/C || align="left"|Stanford || align="center"|7 || align="center"|–– || 497 || 11,405 || 3,972 || 1,237 || 4,044 || 22.9 || 8.0 || 2.5 || 8.1 || align=center|
|-
|align="left"| || align="center"|F || align="left"|Colorado State || align="center"|1 || align="center"| || 4 || 15 || 3 || 1 || 0 || 3.8 || 0.8 || 0.3 || 0.0 || align=center|
|-
|align="left"| || align="center"|C || align="left"|Louisiana-Monroe || align="center"|1 || align="center"| || 2 || 6 || 4 || 0 || 3 || 3.0 || 2.0 || 0.0 || 1.5 || align=center|
|-
|align="left"| || align="center"|F/C || align="left"|UConn || align="center"|1 || align="center"| || 3 || 90 || 26 || 4 || 20 || 30.0 || 8.7 || 1.3 || 6.7 || align=center|
|-
|align="left" bgcolor="#FFFF99"|^ || align="center"|F || align="left"|Tennessee || align="center"|1 || align="center"| || 19 || 419 || 88 || 52 || 176 || 22.1 || 4.6 || 2.7 || 9.3 || align=center|
|-
|align="left"| || align="center"|F || align="left"|Wake Forest || align="center"|1 || align="center"| || 8 || 42 || 11 || 1 || 4 || 5.3 || 1.4 || 0.1 || 0.5 || align=center|
|-
|align="left" bgcolor="#FFCC00"|+ || align="center"|F || align="left"|Russia || align="center"|10 || align="center"|– || 681 || 20,989 || 3,836 || 1,919 || 8,411 || 30.8 || 5.6 || 2.8 || 12.4 || align=center|
|-
|align="left"| || align="center"|G || align="left"|Stanford || align="center"|1 || align="center"| || 74 || 938 || 88 || 190 || 180 || 12.7 || 1.2 || 2.6 || 2.4 || align=center|
|-
|align="left"| || align="center"|G || align="left"|Nebraska-Kearney || align="center"|2 || align="center"|– || 55 || 401 || 26 || 43 || 76 || 7.3 || 0.5 || 0.8 || 1.4 || align=center|
|-
|align="left"| || align="center"|G/F || align="left"|Creighton || align="center"|4 || align="center"|– || 234 || 4,984 || 601 || 358 || 2,062 || 21.3 || 2.6 || 1.5 || 8.8 || align=center|
|-
|align="left"| || align="center"|C || align="left"|Ohio State || align="center"|2 || align="center"|– || 84 || 737 || 183 || 26 || 277 || 8.8 || 2.2 || 0.3 || 3.3 || align=center|
|-
|align="left"| || align="center"|F/C || align="left"|Montana || align="center"|1 || align="center"| || 71 || 1,362 || 279 || 68 || 513 || 19.2 || 3.9 || 1.0 || 7.2 || align=center|
|}

L to M

|-
|align="left"| || align="center"|G || align="left"|Nebraska || align="center"|1 || align="center"| || 19 || 353 || 24 || 30 || 125 || 18.6 || 1.3 || 1.6 || 6.6 || align=center|
|-
|align="left"| || align="center"|G || align="left"|Wake Forest || align="center"|1 || align="center"| || 33 || 542 || 49 || 71 || 193 || 16.4 || 1.5 || 2.2 || 5.8 || align=center|
|-
|align="left"| || align="center"|F/C || align="left"|Wyoming || align="center"|2 || align="center"|– || 152 || 1,543 || 391 || 35 || 650 || 10.2 || 2.6 || 0.2 || 4.3 || align=center|
|-
|align="left"| || align="center"|G || align="left"|Oregon || align="center"|1 || align="center"| || 17 || 398 || 55 || 73 || 114 || 23.4 || 3.2 || 4.3 || 6.7 || align=center|
|-
|align="left"| || align="center"|G/F || align="left"|Marshall || align="center"|1 || align="center"| || 15 || 139 || 31 || 7 || 65 || 9.3 || 2.1 || 0.5 || 4.3 || align=center|
|-
|align="left"| || align="center"|G || align="left"|La Salle || align="center"|1 || align="center"| || 3 || 5 || 1 || 0 || 2 || 1.7 || 0.3 || 0.0 || 0.7 || align=center|
|-
|align="left"| || align="center"|G || align="left"|Bradley || align="center"|2 || align="center"|– || 83 || 787 || 87 || 216 || 140 || 9.5 || 1.0 || 2.6 || 1.7 || align=center|
|-
|align="left"| || align="center"|F || align="left"|Minnesota || align="center"|3 || align="center"|– || 145 || 1,788 || 203 || 94 || 551 || 12.3 || 1.4 || 0.6 || 3.8 || align=center|
|-
|align="left"| || align="center"|G || align="left"|LSU || align="center"|1 || align="center"| || 17 || 227 || 12 || 45 || 64 || 13.4 || 0.7 || 2.6 || 3.8 || align=center|
|-
|align="left"| || align="center"|G || align="left"|Spain || align="center"|2 || align="center"|– || 113 || 2,135 || 194 || 428 || 733 || 18.9 || 1.7 || 3.8 || 6.5 || align=center|
|-
|align="left"| || align="center"|G || align="left"|Oklahoma State || align="center"|1 || align="center"| || 42 || 591 || 39 || 42 || 159 || 14.1 || 0.9 || 1.0 || 3.8 || align=center|
|-
|align="left"| || align="center"|F || align="left"|Kentucky || align="center"|2 || align="center"|– || 151 || 2,540 || 534 || 128 || 928 || 16.8 || 3.5 || 0.8 || 6.1 || align=center|
|-
|align="left"| || align="center"|G || align="left"|Butler || align="center"|2 || align="center"|– || 83 || 2,084 || 231 || 303 || 785 || 25.1 || 2.8 || 3.7 || 9.5 || align=center|
|-
|align="left"| || align="center"|G || align="left"|Mississippi State || align="center"|4 || align="center"|– || 279 || 9,603 || 727 || 517 || 5,158 || 34.4 || 2.6 || 1.9 || 18.5 || align=center|
|-
|align="left" bgcolor="#FFFF99"|^ (#32) || align="center"|F || align="left"|Louisiana Tech || align="center"|18 || align="center"|– || 1,434 || bgcolor="#CFECEC"|53,479 || bgcolor="#CFECEC"|14,601 || 5,085 || bgcolor="#CFECEC"|36,374 || 37.3 || 10.2 || 3.5 || 25.4 || align=center|
|-
|align="left"| || align="center"|F/C || align="left"|Kansas || align="center"|1 || align="center"| || 82 || 1,305 || 214 || 92 || 603 || 15.9 || 2.6 || 1.1 || 7.4 || align=center|
|-
|align="left"| || align="center"|G || align="left"|Utah || align="center"|2 || align="center"|– || 91 || 863 || 105 || 82 || 325 || 9.5 || 1.2 || 0.9 || 3.6 || align=center|
|-
|align="left" bgcolor="#FFFF99"|^ (#7) || align="center"|G || align="left"|LSU || align="center"|6 || align="center"|– || 330 || 12,654 || 1,435 || 1,844 || 8,324 || 38.3 || 4.3 || 5.6 || 25.2 || align=center|
|-
|align="left"| || align="center"|F || align="left"|UConn || align="center"|2 || align="center"|– || 139 || 4,076 || 1,009 || 234 || 1,959 || 29.3 || 7.3 || 1.7 || 14.1 || align=center|
|-
|align="left"| || align="center"|F || align="left"|Maryland || align="center"|1 || align="center"| || 58 || 792 || 156 || 17 || 273 || 13.7 || 2.7 || 0.3 || 4.7 || align=center|
|-
|align="left"| || align="center"|G || align="left"|Marquette || align="center"|1 || align="center"| || 82 || 2,025 || 191 || 124 || 769 || 24.7 || 2.3 || 1.5 || 9.4 || align=center|
|-
|align="left"| || align="center"|G || align="left"|VCU || align="center"|1 || align="center"| || 26 || 363 || 38 || 81 || 134 || 14.0 || 1.5 || 3.1 || 5.2 || align=center|
|-
|align="left"| || align="center"|F || align="left"|Louisiana Tech || align="center"|1 || align="center"| || 4 || 8 || 1 || 0 || 0 || 2.0 || 0.3 || 0.0 || 0.0 || align=center|
|-
|align="left"| || align="center"|G || align="left"|Central Michigan || align="center"|4 || align="center"|– || 277 || 7,621 || 656 || 1,112 || 3,188 || 27.5 || 2.4 || 4.0 || 11.5 || align=center|
|-
|align="left"| || align="center"|G || align="left"|Northwestern || align="center"|1 || align="center"| || 35 || 1,032 || 74 || 157 || 293 || 29.5 || 2.1 || 4.5 || 8.4 || align=center|
|-
|align="left"| || align="center"|G || align="left"|Bowling Green || align="center"|2 || align="center"|– || 119 || 2,614 || 191 || 387 || 786 || 22.0 || 1.6 || 3.3 || 6.6 || align=center|
|-
|align="left"| || align="center"|F/C || align="left"|Southern Illinois || align="center"|2 || align="center"|– || 90 || 1,917 || 556 || 89 || 694 || 21.3 || 6.2 || 1.0 || 7.7 || align=center|
|-
|align="left"| || align="center"|G/F || align="left"|Skyline HS (TX) || align="center"|7 || align="center"|– || 389 || 7,499 || 857 || 510 || 3,264 || 19.3 || 2.2 || 1.3 || 8.4 || align=center|
|-
|align="left"| || align="center"|F || align="left"|Toledo || align="center"|1 || align="center"| || 3 || 19 || 3 || 1 || 4 || 6.3 || 1.0 || 0.3 || 1.3 || align=center|
|-
|align="left"| || align="center"|G/F || align="left"|UAB || align="center"|2 || align="center"|– || 67 || 1,097 || 185 || 77 || 284 || 16.4 || 2.8 || 1.1 || 4.2 || align=center|
|-
|align="left"| || align="center"|F || align="left"|Louisiana Tech || align="center"|7 || align="center"|– || 540 || 14,821 || 3,792 || 950 || 6,713 || 27.4 || 7.0 || 1.8 || 12.4 || align=center|
|-
|align="left" bgcolor="#FBCEB1"|* || align="center"|G || align="left"|Louisville || align="center"|4 || align="center"|– || 278 || 9,371 || 1,151 || 1,184 || 6,501 || 33.7 || 4.1 || 4.3 || 23.4 || align=center|
|-
|align="left"| || align="center"|G || align="left"|Iowa State || align="center"|2 || align="center"|– || 15 || 85 || 6 || 15 || 19 || 5.7 || 0.4 || 1.0 || 1.3 || align=center|
|-
|align="left"| || align="center"|F/C || align="left"|Nebraska || align="center"|1 || align="center"| || 28 || 385 || 82 || 19 || 128 || 13.8 || 2.9 || 0.7 || 4.6 || align=center|
|-
|align="left"| || align="center"|F/C || align="left"|UTPA || align="center"|3 || align="center"|– || 202 || 5,546 || 1,757 || 479 || 1,486 || 27.5 || 8.7 || 2.4 || 7.4 || align=center|
|-
|align="left" bgcolor="#CCFFCC"|x || align="center"|F || align="left"|Indiana || align="center"|2 || align="center"|– || 50 || 281 || 57 || 15 || 71 || 5.6 || 1.1 || 0.3 || 1.4 || align=center|
|-
|align="left"| || align="center"|C || align="left"|Pittsburgh || align="center"|1 || align="center"| || 1 || 4 || 1 || 0 || 2 || 4.0 || 1.0 || 0.0 || 2.0 || align=center|
|-
|align="left"| || align="center"|F || align="left"|Auburn || align="center"|3 || align="center"|– || 193 || 2,939 || 505 || 144 || 1,238 || 15.2 || 2.6 || 0.7 || 6.4 || align=center|
|-
|align="left"|x || align="center"|G || align="left"|Prime Prep Academy (TX) || align="center"|1 || align="center"| || 54 || 850 || 126 || 116 || 395 || 15.7 || 2.3 || 2.1 || 7.3 || align=center|
|-
|align="left"| || align="center"|F || align="left"|USC || align="center"|1 || align="center"| || 11 || 29 || 14 || 1 || 13 || 2.6 || 1.3 || 0.1 || 1.2 || align=center|
|-
|align="left"| || align="center"|G || align="left"|Providence || align="center"|1 || align="center"| || 50 || 478 || 54 || 92 || 203 || 9.6 || 1.1 || 1.8 || 4.1 || align=center|
|-
|align="left"| || align="center"|G || align="left"|Tennessee Tech || align="center"|1 || align="center"| || 17 || 52 || 4 || 2 || 15 || 3.1 || 0.2 || 0.1 || 0.9 || align=center|
|-
|align="left"| || align="center"|G/F || align="left"|Wichita State || align="center"|1 || align="center"| || 1 || 1 || 0 || 0 || 0 || 1.0 || 0.0 || 0.0 || 0.0 || align=center|
|}

N to P

|-
|align="left"| || align="center"|G || align="left"|Louisiana-Monroe || align="center"|2 || align="center"| || 26 || 223 || 24 || 28 || 91 || 8.6 || 0.9 || 1.1 || 3.5 || align=center|
|-
|align="left"| || align="center"|G || align="left"|Washington || align="center"|2 || align="center"|– || 138 || 3,928 || 398 || 347 || 1,629 || 28.5 || 2.9 || 2.5 || 11.8 || align=center|
|-
|align="left"| || align="center"|G || align="left"|Weber State || align="center"|1 || align="center"| || 8 || 94 || 8 || 12 || 32 || 11.8 || 1.0 || 1.5 || 4.0 || align=center|
|-
|align="left"| || align="center"|G || align="left"|Brazil || align="center"|4 || align="center"|– || 199 || 2,817 || 261 || 376 || 955 || 14.2 || 1.3 || 1.9 || 4.8 || align=center|
|-
|align="left" bgcolor="#CCFFCC"|x || align="center"|F || align="left"|Iowa State || align="center"|4 || align="center"|– || 206 || 2,625 || 399 || 141 || 1,136 || 12.7 || 1.9 || 0.7 || 5.5 || align=center|
|-
|align="left"| || align="center"|G || align="left"|Indiana State || align="center"|2 || align="center"|– || 120 || 1,938 || 222 || 158 || 839 || 16.2 || 1.9 || 1.3 || 7.0 || align=center|
|-
|align="left"| || align="center"|F || align="left"|Marquette || align="center"|1 || align="center"| || 22 || 109 || 16 || 6 || 48 || 5.0 || 0.7 || 0.3 || 2.2 || align=center|
|-
|align="left"| || align="center"|F || align="left"|San Diego State || align="center"|1 || align="center"| || 2 || 6 || 1 || 0 || 0 || 3.0 || 0.5 || 0.0 || 0.0 || align=center|
|-
|align="left" bgcolor="#FFCC00"|+ || align="center"|F/C || align="left"|Turkey || align="center"|7 || align="center"|– || 474 || 15,029 || 3,599 || 919 || 7,255 || 31.7 || 7.6 || 1.9 || 15.3 || align=center|
|-
|align="left" bgcolor="#CCFFCC"|x || align="center"|F || align="left"|Baylor || align="center"|4 || align="center"|– || 293 || 7,111 || 1,395 || 580 || 1,715 || 24.3 || 4.8 || 2.0 || 5.9 || align=center|
|-
|align="left" bgcolor="#CCFFCC"|x || align="center"|F/G || align="left"|Yale || align="center"|2 || align="center"|– || 64 || 628 || 101 || 32 || 140 || 9.8 || 1.6 || 0.5 || 2.2 || align=center|
|-
|align="left"| || align="center"|F || align="left"|Oregon State || align="center"|2 || align="center"|– || 64 || 391 || 73 || 18 || 183 || 6.1 || 1.1 || 0.3 || 2.9 || align=center|
|-
|align="left"| || align="center"|C || align="left"|Kansas || align="center"|10 || align="center"|– || 700 || 14,197 || 3,978 || 406 || 3,425 || 20.3 || 5.7 || 0.6 || 4.9 || align=center|
|-
|align="left"| || align="center"|C || align="left"|Fordham || align="center"|1 || align="center"| || 21 || 85 || 17 || 4 || 21 || 4.0 || 0.8 || 0.2 || 1.0 || align=center|
|-
|align="left"| || align="center"|G || align="left"|Houston || align="center"|1 || align="center"| || 23 || 210 || 21 || 8 || 69 || 9.1 || 0.9 || 0.3 || 3.0 || align=center|
|-
|align="left"| || align="center"|F || align="left"|Kentucky || align="center"|4 || align="center"|– || 231 || 3,175 || 684 || 198 || 1,142 || 13.7 || 3.0 || 0.9 || 4.9 || align=center|
|-
|align="left"| || align="center"|G || align="left"|Colorado State || align="center"|1 || align="center"| || 71 || 1,376 || 134 || 190 || 441 || 19.4 || 1.9 || 2.7 || 6.2 || align=center|
|-
|align="left"| || align="center"|F/C || align="left"|Dartmouth || align="center"|1 || align="center"| || 28 || 85 || 21 || 6 || 40 || 3.0 || 0.8 || 0.2 || 1.4 || align=center|
|-
|align="left"| || align="center"|F/C || align="left"|St. John's || align="center"|1 || align="center"| || 62 || 370 || 96 || 16 || 82 || 6.0 || 1.5 || 0.3 || 1.3 || align=center|
|-
|align="left"| || align="center"|G/F || align="left"|Montenegro || align="center"|1 || align="center"| || 79 || 1,144 || 159 || 60 || 382 || 14.5 || 2.0 || 0.8 || 4.8 || align=center|
|-
|align="left"| || align="center"|C || align="left"|Germany || align="center"|1 || align="center"| || 12 || 82 || 15 || 2 || 24 || 6.8 || 1.3 || 0.2 || 2.0 || align=center|
|-
|align="left"| || align="center"|F/C || align="left"|Virginia || align="center"|2 || align="center"|– || 163 || 3,438 || 831 || 68 || 864 || 21.1 || 5.1 || 0.4 || 5.3 || align=center|
|-
|align="left"| || align="center"|F/C || align="left"|Central Michigan || align="center"|4 || align="center"|– || 321 || 9,186 || 2,121 || 554 || 2,873 || 28.6 || 6.6 || 1.7 || 9.0 || align=center|
|-
|align="left"| || align="center"|F || align="left"|Illinois || align="center"|1 || align="center"| || 3 || 13 || 3 || 0 || 2 || 4.3 || 1.0 || 0.0 || 0.7 || align=center|
|-
|align="left"| || align="center"|G || align="left"|Utah Valley || align="center"|4 || align="center"|– || 232 || 2,849 || 250 || 365 || 887 || 12.3 || 1.1 || 1.6 || 3.8 || align=center|
|}

R to S

|-
|align="left"| || align="center"|C || align="left"|Bosnia and Herzegovina || align="center"|1 || align="center"| || 12 || 128 || 28 || 6 || 19 || 10.7 || 2.3 || 0.5 || 1.6 || align=center|
|-
|align="left"| || align="center"|F/C || align="left"|Cincinnati || align="center"|1 || align="center"| || 16 || 339 || 118 || 23 || 119 || 21.2 || 7.4 || 1.4 || 7.4 || align=center|
|-
|align="left"| || align="center"|F/C || align="left"|BYU || align="center"|2 || align="center"|– || 110 || 1,342 || 231 || 92 || 666 || 12.2 || 2.1 || 0.8 || 6.1 || align=center|
|-
|align="left" bgcolor="#FFCC00"|+ || align="center"|F/C || align="left"|Tennessee State || align="center"|2 || align="center"|– || 125 || 5,419 || 1,865 || 245 || 2,901 || bgcolor="#CFECEC"|43.4 || bgcolor="#CFECEC"|14.9 || 2.0 || 23.2 || align=center|
|-
|align="left"| || align="center"|F || align="left"|DePaul || align="center"|1 || align="center"| || 56 || 651 || 144 || 49 || 323 || 11.6 || 2.6 || 0.9 || 5.8 || align=center|
|-
|align="left"| || align="center"|F || align="left"|Wisconsin || align="center"|2 || align="center"|– || 42 || 273 || 36 || 23 || 107 || 6.5 || 0.9 || 0.5 || 2.5 || align=center|
|-
|align="left"| || align="center"|G || align="left"|Spain || align="center"|2 || align="center"|– || 145 || 4,153 || 594 || 826 || 1,872 || 28.6 || 4.1 || 5.7 || 12.9 || align=center|
|-
|align="left"| || align="center"|G || align="left"|Wake Forest || align="center"|3 || align="center"|– || 224 || 2,262 || 175 || 502 || 790 || 10.1 || 0.8 || 2.2 || 3.5 || align=center|
|-
|align="left"| || align="center"|F || align="left"|Tulsa || align="center"|1 || align="center"| || 41 || 733 || 207 || 41 || 92 || 17.9 || 5.0 || 1.0 || 2.2 || align=center|
|-
|align="left"| || align="center"|G/F || align="left"|Kansas || align="center"|1 || align="center"| || 38 || 418 || 44 || 24 || 79 || 11.0 || 1.2 || 0.6 || 2.1 || align=center|
|-
|align="left"| || align="center"|F || align="left"|Long Beach State || align="center"|9 || align="center"|– || 628 || 16,443 || 2,387 || 869 || 5,752 || 26.2 || 3.8 || 1.4 || 9.2 || align=center|
|-
|align="left"| || align="center"|F || align="left"|Syracuse || align="center"|1 || align="center"| || 30 || 400 || 74 || 35 || 150 || 13.3 || 2.5 || 1.2 || 5.0 || align=center|
|-
|align="left"| || align="center"|F/C || align="left"|Syracuse || align="center"|2 || align="center"|– || 132 || 3,261 || 876 || 311 || 1,263 || 24.7 || 6.6 || 2.4 || 9.6 || align=center|
|-
|align="left"| || align="center"|F || align="left"|LIU Brooklyn || align="center"|3 || align="center"|– || 176 || 2,368 || 521 || 191 || 845 || 13.5 || 3.0 || 1.1 || 4.8 || align=center|
|-
|align="left"| || align="center"|G/F || align="left"|Switzerland || align="center"|2 || align="center"|– || 88 || 1,415 || 284 || 60 || 502 || 16.1 || 3.2 || 0.7 || 5.7 || align=center|
|-
|align="left"| || align="center"|G || align="left"|UNLV || align="center"|1 || align="center"| || 6 || 73 || 3 || 7 || 15 || 12.2 || 0.5 || 1.2 || 2.5 || align=center|
|-
|align="left"| || align="center"|G || align="left"|Nevada || align="center"|1 || align="center"| || 68 || 906 || 121 || 36 || 338 || 13.3 || 1.8 || 0.5 || 5.0 || align=center|
|-
|align="left"| || align="center"|C || align="left"|Louisville || align="center"|3 || align="center"|– || 184 || 4,382 || 1,224 || 71 || 1,390 || 23.8 || 6.7 || 0.4 || 7.6 || align=center|
|-
|align="left"| || align="center"|G/F || align="left"|Kansas || align="center"|3 || align="center"|– || 169 || 3,245 || 462 || 122 || 1,497 || 19.2 || 2.7 || 0.7 || 8.9 || align=center|
|-
|align="left"| || align="center"|G || align="left"|Oklahoma State || align="center"|2 || align="center"|– || 141 || 3,051 || 222 || 248 || 989 || 21.6 || 1.6 || 1.8 || 7.0 || align=center|
|-
|align="left"| || align="center"|G || align="left"|Washington Union HS (CA) || align="center"|4 || align="center"|– || 222 || 3,698 || 422 || 266 || 1,311 || 16.7 || 1.9 || 1.2 || 5.9 || align=center|
|-
|align="left"| || align="center"|G || align="left"|Gonzaga || align="center"|1 || align="center"| || 3 || 9 || 0 || 0 || 10 || 3.0 || 0.0 || 0.0 || 3.3 || align=center|
|-
|align="left" bgcolor="#FFFF99"|^ (#12) || align="center"|G || align="left"|Gonzaga || align="center" bgcolor="#CFECEC"|19 || align="center"|– || bgcolor="#CFECEC"|1,504 || 47,764 || 4,051 || bgcolor="#CFECEC"|15,806 || 19,711 || 31.8 || 2.7 || bgcolor="#CFECEC"|10.5 || 13.1 || align=center|
|}

T to W

|-
|align="left"| || align="center"|F/C || align="left"|SMU || align="center"|1 || align="center"| || 31 || 572 || 109 || 26 || 153 || 18.5 || 3.5 || 0.8 || 4.9 || align=center|
|-
|align="left"| || align="center"|F || align="left"|San Diego State || align="center"|1 || align="center"| || 7 || 48 || 12 || 2 || 13 || 6.9 || 1.7 || 0.3 || 1.9 || align=center|
|-
|align="left"| || align="center"|G || align="left"|Oklahoma State || align="center"|1 || align="center"| || 2 || 8 || 0 || 1 || 0 || 4.0 || 0.0 || 0.5 || 0.0 || align=center|
|-
|align="left"| || align="center"|F/C || align="left"|UC Irvine || align="center"|1 || align="center"| || 2 || 6 || 2 || 0 || 4 || 3.0 || 1.0 || 0.0 || 2.0 || align=center|
|-
|align="left"| || align="center"|G || align="left"|Iowa State || align="center"|3 || align="center"|– || 111 || 1,838 || 171 || 436 || 375 || 16.6 || 1.5 || 3.9 || 3.4 || align=center|
|-
|align="left"| || align="center"|G/F || align="left"|BYU || align="center"|2 || align="center"| || 60 || 523 || 73 || 32 || 159 || 8.7 || 1.2 || 0.5 || 2.7 || align=center|
|-
|align="left"| || align="center"|G/F || align="left"|Notre Dame || align="center"|2 || align="center"|– || 128 || 2,841 || 359 || 348 || 1,166 || 22.2 || 2.8 || 2.7 || 9.1 || align=center|
|-
|align="left"| || align="center"|C || align="left"|Kentucky || align="center"|1 || align="center"| || 79 || 1,011 || 236 || 32 || 470 || 12.8 || 3.0 || 0.4 || 5.9 || align=center|
|-
|align="left"| || align="center"|F/C || align="left"|Baylor || align="center"|2 || align="center"|– || 114 || 1,130 || 240 || 81 || 281 || 9.9 || 2.1 || 0.7 || 2.5 || align=center|
|-
|align="left"| || align="center"|G || align="left"|Kansas || align="center"|4 || align="center"|– || 224 || 3,010 || 264 || 540 || 970 || 13.4 || 1.2 || 2.4 || 4.3 || align=center|
|-
|align="left"| || align="center"|C || align="left"|UNLV || align="center"|1 || align="center"| || 11 || 93 || 25 || 9 || 34 || 8.5 || 2.3 || 0.8 || 3.1 || align=center|
|-
|align="left"| || align="center"|G || align="left"|Loyola (IL) || align="center"|1 || align="center"| || 8 || 47 || 4 || 3 || 15 || 5.9 || 0.5 || 0.4 || 1.9 || align=center|
|-
|align="left"| || align="center"|C || align="left"|Florida || align="center"|1 || align="center"| || 37 || 851 || 262 || 101 || 366 || 23.0 || 7.1 || 2.7 || 9.9 || align=center|
|-
|align="left"| || align="center"|G || align="left"|Niagara || align="center"|1 || align="center"| || 40 || 438 || 75 || 32 || 180 || 11.0 || 1.9 || 0.8 || 4.5 || align=center|
|-
|align="left"| || align="center"|G || align="left"|UCLA || align="center"|3 || align="center"|– || 178 || 3,429 || 390 || 685 || 588 || 19.3 || 2.2 || 3.8 || 3.3 || align=center|
|-
|align="left"| || align="center"|F || align="left"|South Carolina || align="center"|3 || align="center"|– || 89 || 1,019 || 119 || 93 || 276 || 11.4 || 1.3 || 1.0 || 3.1 || align=center|
|-
|align="left"| || align="center"|G || align="left"|Xavier (LS) || align="center"|1 || align="center"| || 39 || 775 || 98 || 161 || 280 || 19.9 || 2.5 || 4.1 || 7.2 || align=center|
|-
|align="left"| || align="center"|G || align="left"|Washington State || align="center"|1 || align="center"| || 5 || 69 || 10 || 7 || 28 || 13.8 || 2.0 || 1.4 || 5.6 || align=center|
|-
|align="left"| || align="center"|C || align="left"|Walsh || align="center"|1 || align="center"| || 23 || 212 || 43 || 17 || 49 || 9.2 || 1.9 || 0.7 || 2.1 || align=center|
|-
|align="left"| || align="center"|F || align="left"|Pepperdine || align="center"|1 || align="center"| || 1 || 2 || 0 || 0 || 0 || 2.0 || 0.0 || 0.0 || 0.0 || align=center|
|-
|align="left"| || align="center"|F/C || align="left"|Marquette || align="center"|1 || align="center"| || 32 || 328 || 97 || 18 || 67 || 10.3 || 3.0 || 0.6 || 2.1 || align=center|
|-
|align="left"| || align="center"|F/C || align="left"|Illinois State || align="center"|6 || align="center"|– || 427 || 9,482 || 2,447 || 444 || 3,445 || 22.2 || 5.7 || 1.0 || 8.1 || align=center|
|-
|align="left"| || align="center"|F/C || align="left"|Xavier || align="center"|1 || align="center"| || 6 || 12 || 3 || 1 || 4 || 2.0 || 0.5 || 0.2 || 0.7 || align=center|
|-
|align="left" bgcolor="#FFCC00"|+ || align="center"|G || align="left"|Illinois || align="center"|6 || align="center"|– || 439 || 15,632 || 1,407 || 4,003 || 7,576 || 35.6 || 3.2 || 9.1 || 17.3 || align=center|
|-
|align="left"| || align="center"|G || align="left"|Notre Dame || align="center"|1 || align="center"| || 77 || 1,794 || 106 || 183 || 506 || 23.3 || 1.4 || 2.4 || 6.6 || align=center|
|-
|align="left"| || align="center"|G || align="left"|Memphis || align="center"|1 || align="center"| || 5 || 42 || 3 || 4 || 18 || 8.4 || 0.6 || 0.8 || 3.6 || align=center|
|-
|align="left"| || align="center"|G/F || align="left"|Portland State || align="center"|1 || align="center"| || 18 || 210 || 17 || 10 || 92 || 11.7 || 0.9 || 0.6 || 5.1 || align=center|
|-
|align="left"| || align="center"|F || align="left"|North Carolina || align="center"|2 || align="center"|– || 139 || 3,401 || 597 || 155 || 1,132 || 24.5 || 4.3 || 1.1 || 8.1 || align=center|
|-
|align="left"| || align="center"|G || align="left"|Alabama || align="center"|2 || align="center"| || 103 || 2,190 || 182 || 361 || 876 || 21.3 || 1.8 || 3.5 || 8.5 || align=center|
|-
|align="left"| || align="center"|G/F || align="left"|Utah State || align="center"|4 || align="center"|– || 222 || 4,959 || 914 || 300 || 2,726 || 22.3 || 4.1 || 1.4 || 12.3 || align=center|
|-
|align="left"| || align="center"|G || align="left"|Long Beach State || align="center"|1 || align="center"| || 44 || 346 || 38 || 37 || 147 || 7.9 || 0.9 || 0.8 || 3.3 || align=center|
|-
|align="left"| || align="center"|G || align="left"|Gonzaga || align="center"|1 || align="center"| || 10 || 50 || 6 || 6 || 14 || 5.0 || 0.6 || 0.6 || 1.4 || align=center|
|-
|align="left"| || align="center"|C || align="left"|Kansas || align="center"|2 || align="center"|– || 102 || 1,090 || 294 || 27 || 363 || 10.7 || 2.9 || 0.3 || 3.6 || align=center|
|-
|align="left"| || align="center"|G || align="left"|South Dakota State || align="center"|1 || align="center"| || 5 || 19 || 2 || 1 || 2 || 3.8 || 0.4 || 0.2 || 0.4 || align=center|
|-
|align="left"| || align="center"|F || align="left"|Tennessee || align="center"|1 || align="center"| || 42 || 342 || 65 || 9 || 144 || 8.1 || 1.5 || 0.2 || 3.4 || align=center|
|-
|align="left"| || align="center"|G || align="left"|Marquette || align="center"|1 || align="center"| || 5 || 22 || 1 || 3 || 4 || 4.4 || 0.2 || 0.6 || 0.8 || align=center|
|-
|align="left"| || align="center"|C || align="left"|Seton Hall || align="center"|1 || align="center"| || 15 || 92 || 10 || 0 || 19 || 6.1 || 0.7 || 0.0 || 1.3 || align=center|
|}

External links
 
 
 Utah Jazz all-time roster

References

National Basketball Association all-time rosters
 
roster